John Silva may refer to:

 Giant Silva (born 1963), Brazilian basketball player and later mixed martial artist and wrestler
 John Silva (tennis) (born 1977), Panamanian tennis player
 John Silva (The Young and the Restless)
 John da Silva (1934–2021), New Zealand wrestler and boxer
 John de Silva (1857–1922), Sri Lankan playwright

See also
John D'Silva (disambiguation)